Japan is scheduled to compete at the 2024 Summer Olympics in Paris from 26 July to 11 August 2024. Japanese athletes have appeared in every edition of the Summer Olympic Games from 1912 onwards, except for two occasions: the 1948 Summer Olympics in London, to which they were not invited because of the nation's role in World War II, and the 1980 Summer Olympics in Moscow, as part of the United States-led boycott.

Competitors
The following is the list of number of competitors in the Games.

Athletics

Japanese track and field athletes achieved the entry standards for Paris 2024, either by passing the direct qualifying mark (or time for track and road races) or by world ranking, in the following events (a maximum of 3 athletes each):

Track and road events
Men

Women

Cycling

BMX
Freestyle
Japanese riders received a single quota spot in the men's BMX freestyle for Paris 2024, finishing among the top two at the 2022 UCI Urban Cycling World Championships in Abu Dhabi, United Arab Emirates.

Gymnastics

Artistic
Japan fielded a squad of five male gymnasts for Paris after scoring a runner-up finish in the team all-around at the 2022 World Championships in Liverpool, Great Britain.

Men
Team

Surfing

Japanese surfers confirmed a single shortboard quota place for Tahiti, following their successful triumph in the men's team event at the 2022 ISA World Surfing Games in Huntington Beach, California.

References

Nations at the 2024 Summer Olympics
2024
2024 in Japanese sport